The 2013 Women's Cricket World Cup was the tenth Women's Cricket World Cup, hosted by India for the third time, and held from 31 January to 17 February 2013. India previously hosted the World Cup in 1978 and 1997. Australia won the tournament for the sixth time, beating West Indies by 114 runs in the final.

Qualification
Four teams, Australia, England, India and New Zealand; had already qualified for this tournament. They were joined by Sri Lanka, South Africa, Pakistan and West Indies through the 2011 Women's Cricket World Cup Qualifier in Bangladesh, which also doubled as a qualifying tournament for the 2012 ICC Women's World Twenty20.

Stadiums

Results

Group stage
The eight qualifying teams were split into two groups for the group stage, with traditional rivals Australia and New Zealand drawn together in Group B alongside South Africa and Pakistan, while India and West Indies were drawn together in Group A along with England and Sri Lanka. The top three teams from each group progress to the Super Six stage while the fourth team advances to the 7th Place Play-off.

Group A

On the Final Matchday – Tuesday 5 February
England, advanced as seed A1 from Group A to the Super Six with victory in their final Group A match over the West Indies.  Sri Lanka advanced as seed A2 from Group A following their 138 run victory over India who were eliminated. As a result, Sri Lanka takes over India's seeding (A2).
 West Indies advanced as seed A3 despite their defeat to England due to their superior Net Run Rate over India.
 India was eliminated from the 2013 Women's Cricket World Cup.

Group B

On the Final Matchday – Tuesday 5 February
Australia and New Zealand advanced as seeds B1 and B2 respectively having already secured qualification ahead of their final fixture with wins in both their opening two matches.
 South Africa advanced as seed B3 after their victory over Pakistan who subsequently have been eliminated from the 2013 Women's Cricket World Cup.

Super Six
The top three teams in each group moved on to the Super Six stage, which was scored as a complete round-robin. Each team played the three Super Six qualifiers from outside its group, whilst carrying forward its two results against the other Super Six teams which qualified from its group.  The top two teams in the final table qualified for the final.

On the Final Matchday – Wednesday 13 February
Sri Lanka lost to South Africa, losing their chance to make the 3rd place playoff.
 Australia lost to West Indies, ensuring they would not have to play England or New Zealand in the final.

Play-Offs

3rd place playoff

5th place playoff

7th place playoff

Final

Final Positions

Statistics

Most Runs

Most Wickets

References

Further reading

 

 
2013
2013 in women's cricket
International women's cricket competitions in India
International cricket competitions in 2013
January 2013 sports events in Asia
February 2013 sports events in Asia